Huilong is a town of southwestern Liangping County in northeastern Chongqing Municipality, People's Republic of China, situated near the border with Sichuan and located  southwest of the county seat and  northeast of downtown Chongqing. , it has one residential community (社区) and 15 villages under its administration.

References

Township-level divisions of Chongqing
Towns in Chongqing